Tukamjan (also Romanized as Tūkāmjān; also known as Takām Chān and Takāmjān) is a village in Siyarastaq Yeylaq Rural District, Rahimabad District, Rudsar County, Gilan Province, Iran. At the 2006 census, its population was 27, in 13 families.

References 

Populated places in Rudsar County